Poa secunda (variously known by the common names of Sandberg bluegrass, alkali bluegrass, big bluegrass, Canby's bluegrass, Nevada bluegrass, one-sided bluegrass, Pacific bluegrass, pine blugrass, slender bluegrass, wild bluegrass, and curly bluegrass) is a widespread species of perennial bunchgrass native to North and South America. It is highly resistant to drought conditions, and provides excellent fodder; and has also been used in controlling soil erosion, and as revegetator, often after forest fires. Cultivars include 'Canbar', 'Service', 'Sherman', and 'Supernova'. Historically,  indigenous Americans, such as the Gosiute of Utah, have used P. secunda for food. It was originally described botanically in 1830 by Jan Svatopluk Presl, from a holotype collected from Chile by Thaddäus Haenke in 1790.

Native distribution
In North America, Poa secunda is native to Canada (in Alberta; British Columbia; eastern Quebec; southern Saskatchewan; southern Yukon Territory; and, rarely, in Ontario), the U.S. (in southeastern Alaska; Arizona; California; Colorado; the Dakotas; Idaho; Isle Royale in Michigan; Montana; northwestern Nebraska; Nevada; New Mexico; Oregon; Utah; Washington; and Wyoming), and northwestern Mexico.
In South America, it is native to Argentina (found in Chubut; Neuquén; and Santa Cruz), and central Chile.

References

External links
Taxon report from Calflora
Photo gallery from CalPhotos database
Jepson Manual Treatment from the University of California
Fire Effects Information Service information from the U.S. Forest Service
Original description published in 1830, in Latin from the Biodiversity Heritage Library

secunda
Plants described in 1830
Flora of South America
Grasses of Canada
Flora of North America
Forages
Plants used in Native American cuisine